This page details futsal records in Indonesia.

National team

Individual
Most appearances: 
Most goals: 
Most goals in a game: 6, joint record:
Socrates Matulessy (v. Guam, 3 March 2007)
Jailani Ladjanibi (v. Guam, 3 March 2007)

Scorelines
Biggest win: 21 - 2,  v. Guam (3 March 2007)
Biggest home win: 6 - 0,  v. China (22 October 2002)
Biggest away win: 3 - 1,  v. Thailand (29 August 2008)
Biggest win in neutral ground: 21 - 2, v. Guam (Taipei, 3 March 2007)
Biggest defeat: 1 - 20, v. Iran (22 May 2006)
Biggest home defeat: 1 - 5,  v. Japan (23 October 2002)
Biggest away defeat: 0 - 11,  v. Thailand (12 May 2008)
Biggest defeat in neutral ground: 1 - 20, v. Iran (Tashkent, 22 May 2006)
Highest scoring: 23 goals, Indonesia 21 - 2 Guam (3 March 2007)

League
Records in this section refer to Indonesian Futsal League from its founding in 2006 to the present.

Titles
Most League titles: 2, Electric PLN

Top-flight Appearances
Most appearances: 5 seasons, Electric PLN (2006–present)
Most consecutive seasons in top-flight: 5 seasons, Electric PLN (2006–present)

Individual
Most IFL champion's medals: 2, joint record (7 players)
Most career goals: 
Most goals in a season: 30, Boi Boas (2009)
Most goals in a game: 6, Boi Boas (for Mutiara Hitam 6 - 7 Electric PLN, 3 May 2009)

Scorelines
Biggest margin: 14 goals, Biangbola 15 - 1 SWAP FC ( 10 February 2007)
Highest scoring: 21 goals, Mastrans FC 15 - 6 Dupiad Fak Fak (5 July 2008)

Managers
Most IFL title wins: 1, joint record (4 managers)

See also
 Indonesian Futsal League
 Indonesia national futsal team

References

External links
 Official website of PSSI

Records